Shorea oblongifolia is a species of plant in the family Dipterocarpaceae. It is endemic to Sri Lanka.

Culture
Known as බෙරලිය (beraliya) in Sinhala.

References

oblongifolia
Endemic flora of Sri Lanka
Trees of Sri Lanka
Critically endangered flora of Asia
Taxonomy articles created by Polbot